Astroblepus fissidens is a species of catfish of the family Astroblepidae. It can be found on Ecuador.

A. fissidens occurs on stony stream bottoms or on muddy streambeds with pebbles, it is also found in streams which have variable flows where the banks are moderately to steeply sloped or undercut. It prefers depths of between 0.1-0.9 m and it feeds on small arthropods and detritus. It has been recorded from the Mataje and Santiago river basins in northwestern Ecuador between altitudes of 1000m to 2700m. There is little information about its population but it may have been affected by habitat modification and pollution due to increasing urbanisation around the rivers it occurs in.

References

Bibliography
Eschmeyer, William N., ed. 1998. Catalog of Fishes. Special Publication of the Center for Biodiversity Research and Information, num. 1, vol. 1–3. California Academy of Sciences. San Francisco, California, United States. 2905. .

Astroblepus
Fish described in 1904
Freshwater fish of Ecuador
Catfish of South America
Taxa named by Charles Tate Regan